The Institute of Psychology is a graduate school of psychology and constitutes the department of psychology of the Paris Cité University. It is currently located at the Centre Henri-Piéron, 71 avenue Édouard-Vaillant, Boulogne-Billancourt. Being the birthplace of French psychology, the institute was founded in 1920 by Henri Piéron, with the mission of providing psychology education and a center for research. It is the oldest psychology-specific education institution in France. The last three stories of the 6-stories building are assigned to research laboratories, and the basement hosts the oldest psychology-dedicated library in France (which received the  label of excellence).

History 
Created in 1920 by Henri Piéron, the Institute of Psychology is the first university institute (the term 'institute', as opposed to 'school', underlines the important focus on research activity) of the University of Paris. It was meant to gather psychologists from the University of Paris, the Collège de France, and the Ecole Pratique des Hautes Etudes, and delivered a one-year diploma of psychological studies with specialities in "Psychology", "Pedagogy", or "Applied Psychology".

In 1947, Daniel Lagache implements a two-year psychology bachelor's degree with specialities in "General Psychology", "Child Psychology", "Social Life Psychology", and "Psychophysiology".

In 1965, Paul Fraisse becomes the institute's director.

In 1999, as part of a plan to regroup all the research laboratories scattered across Paris, the institute gets transferred to its current location in Boulogne-Billancourt.

In 2020, the Institute of Psychology joins the Faculty of Social Sciences and Humanities of the Paris Cité University.

Curriculum

Social Sciences 

 Bachelor of Psychology
 Master of Psychology (professional)
 Occupational Psychology
 Clinical Psychology
 Master of Psychology (research)
 Individual, social, environment
 Psychopathology : emotions, affects, behaviors, psychic processes

Life Sciences 

 Master of Psychology (professional)
 Neuropsychology
 Developmental psychology
 Master of Psychology (research)
 Cognitive Psychology
 European Master (in collaboration with the universities of Valence, Coimbra, Bologna et Barcelona)
 Work, Organizational, and Personnel Psychology

The doctorate degree is delivered through within the doctoral school Cognition, comportement, conduites humaines (ED 261) which includes 18 research laboratories.

Directors 
 1920 : The institute is originally directed by a board including Henri Piéron (EPHE), founding member until 1951, as well as Henri Delacroix (Sorbonne, Lettres), Georges Dumas (Sorbonne, Lettres), Étienne Rabaud (Sorbonne, Sciences) and Pierre Janet (Collège de France).
 1952 : Paul Fraisse replaces Henri Piéron with a director board including Daniel Lagache (Sorbonne, lettres), Jean Delay (Faculté de médecine), and Pierre-Paul Grassé (Sorbonne, Sciences).
 1960 : Daniel Lagache steps back from co-directorship.
 1961 : Paul Fraisse becomes the only director.
 1969-1993 : The institute splits into the 'Institute of Psychology' proper and the 'Unit of Formation and Research (UFR) - Institut de Psychologie'
 (Institute) 1968-1974 : Hélène Gratiot Alphandéry
 (Institute) 1974-1980 : Claude Lévy-Leboyer
 (Institute) 1981- 1988 : Roland Doron
 (Institute) 1988-1992 : Jean-Claude Sperandio
 (UFR) 1969-1973 : Paul Fraisse
 (UFR) 1973-1974 : Pierre Oléron
 (UFR) 1974-1977 : Guy Durandin
 (UFR) 1977-1981 : Germaine de Montmollin
 (UFR) 1981-1985 : Colette Chiland
 (UFR) 1985-1989 : Hervé Beauchesne
 (UFR) 1989-1993 : Pierre Coslin
 1993-1998 : Roger Lécuyer
 1998-2002 : Serban Ionescu
 2002-2007 : Jean-Didier Bagot
 2007-2012 : François Marty
 2012-2017 : Ewa Drozda-Senkowska
 2017-2022 : Isabelle Jambaqué-Aubourg

References

University of Paris
1920 establishments in France